Ivan Lendl was the defending champion.

Lendl successfully defended his title, defeating Eliot Teltscher in the final, 6–3, 6–2.

Seeds

  John McEnroe (third round)
  Björn Borg (withdrew)
  Jimmy Connors (first round)
  Ivan Lendl (champion)
  Peter McNamara (third round)
  Eliot Teltscher (final)
  Brian Teacher (quarterfinals)
  Vitas Gerulaitis (second round)
  John Sadri (second round)
  Vijay Amritraj (semifinals)
  Tomáš Šmíd (third round)
  Sammy Giammalva Jr. (second round)
  Tom Gullikson (third round)
 N/A
  Shlomo Glickstein (semifinals)
  Kevin Curren (second round)

Draw

Finals

Top half

Section 1

Section 2

Section 3

Section 4

External links
 Main draw

1981 Grand Prix (tennis)